Engin Ali Artan (born 12 September 1992) is a Turkish figure skater. He is a three-time Turkish national champion and the 2015 Sarajevo Open champion.

Programs

Competitive highlights 
CS: Challenger Series; JGP: Junior Grand Prix

References

External links 
 

1992 births
Turkish male single skaters
Living people
Sportspeople from İzmit
Competitors at the 2015 Winter Universiade
20th-century Turkish people
21st-century Turkish people